Navelli is a comune and town in the province of L'Aquila, in the Abruzzo region of central Italy. It is renowned for the local saffron production.

Navelli and its frazione (hamlet) Civitaretenga are medieval villages located in a territory inhabited in historic times by the Vestini Italic tribe.

Main sights 
Church of San Sebastiano
Palazzo Santucci 
Rural churches of the plain: Saint Mary in Cerulis and Madonna delle Grazie
Medieval tower of Civitaretenga